Lyophyllum is a genus of about 40 species of fungi, widespread in north temperate regions.

Species

References

Lyophyllaceae
Agaricales genera